The 1965 Lehigh Engineers football team was an American football team that represented Lehigh University during the 1965 NCAA College Division football season. Lehigh finished second-to-last in the Middle Atlantic Conference, University Division, and was one of three co-champions in the Middle Three Conference.

In their first year under head coach Fred Dunlap, the Engineers compiled a 1–8 record. Robert Draucher and Harold Yeich were the team captains.

In conference play, Lehigh's 1–3 record against opponents in the MAC University Division represented the sixth-best winning percentage in the seven-team circuit, ahead of Lafayette's 1–5. All three teams in the Middle Three recorded one win and one loss against league rivals, splitting the championship three ways. Lehigh beat Lafayette, its only win of the year, but lost to Rutgers.

Lehigh played its home games at Taylor Stadium on the university campus in Bethlehem, Pennsylvania.

Schedule

References

Lehigh
Lehigh
Lehigh Mountain Hawks football seasons
Lehigh Engineers football